is a Japanese confection sold mainly as a souvenir snack (miyagegashi). It is one of the best known meibutsu (famous regional products) of Kyoto. It is made from glutinous , sugar, and cinnamon. Baked, it is similar to senbei. The shape of the hard crackers resembles a Japanese harp or koto, or a bamboo stalk cut lengthways. 

The unbaked yatsuhashi (Nama yatsuhashi) is cut into a square shape after being rolled very thin, and folded in half diagonally to make a triangle shape, with the red bean paste inside. Unbaked yatsuhashi may also come in a variety of different flavours. Popular flavours include cinnamon and matcha. Yatsutashi is also rolled into a rectangular shape and steamed.

References

Wagashi